Ambition Entertainment is an entertainment company consisting of five core businesses: recorded music, artist management, music publishing, artist merchandise and live events.

Ambition Entertainment is made up of labels
Ambition Records
Fanfare Records
Fanfare Classics
Fanfare Jazz
One Take Records
Ambition Special Products

All Ambition Entertainment releases are distributed in Australia by Sony Music Entertainment Australia Pty Ltd. Ambition Entertainment is fully accredited by ARIA and report sales daily for chart inclusion.

In September 2016, it was announced that Ambition Entertainment had signed a distribution deal with Sony Music Australia.
 
Ambitions' record label focus on adult contemporary, jazz, classical and country music.

Current artists
 Anthony Warlow
 Beccy Cole
 Captain & Tennille
 Charlie A'Court
 Colin Buchanan
 Dave Loew
 Denis Walter
 Don Burrows
 Gilbert O'Sullivan
 James Morrison
 Jon English
 Julie Anthony
 K.D. Lang
 Kevin Johnson
 Leo Sayer
 Marcia Hines
 Marina Prior 
 Mark Sholtez
 Mary Kiani
 Michael Crawford
 Mormon Tabernacle Choir
 Mirusia
 Nicolas De Angelis
 Olivia Newton-John
 Paulini
 Renée Geyer
 Richard Clayderman
 Russell Morris
 The Celtic Tenors
 The Everly Brothers
 Tim Draxl
 Tina Arena
 Todd McKenney
 Wendy Matthews

References

External links
 

Record label distributors
Australian independent record labels
Record labels established in 2009
2009 establishments in Australia